Vincent Armando Salas Reyes (born 2 April 1989 in Santiago, Chile) is a Chilean former professional footballer who plays for Fernandez Vial of the Segunda División Profesional de Chile as a defender.

DPMM FC

Transferring to Bruneian club DPMM in 2017 with fellow Chilean Daud Gazale, Salas adapted well, making his target to help the team advance up the standings and recording his debut in a 4–0 loss to Albirex Niigata S.

A tall player, he was described by DPMM coach Steve Kean as 'dominant in the air' but also showed a propensity for fouling, picking up a straight red card in a 1–4 defeat to Home United, his team's 12th loss of the season.

References

External links

1989 births
Living people
Footballers from Santiago
Chilean footballers
Chilean expatriate footballers
Association football defenders
C.D. Arturo Fernández Vial footballers
Deportes Concepción (Chile) footballers
Puerto Montt footballers
DPMM FC players
Deportes Copiapó footballers
Tercera División de Chile players
Primera B de Chile players
Segunda División Profesional de Chile players
Singapore Premier League players
Chilean expatriate sportspeople in Brunei
Chilean expatriate sportspeople in Singapore
Expatriate footballers in Brunei
Expatriate footballers in Singapore